= Rahamim Melamed-Cohen =

Israeli educator (1937–2020)

Rahamim Melamed–Cohen (Hebrew: רחמים מלמד-כהן; 1937–2020) was a prominent Israeli educator who gained secondary fame as an artist and author after being stricken by Lou Gehrig's disease.
